Luke MacAuley Jordan (born 21 November 1998) is an English footballer who played as a winger for the Lander Bearcats

Career
Jordan was born in Burnley, Lancashire and attended Unity College. He began his career with Morecambe and made his professional debut on 7 January 2017 in a 4–1 victory against Notts County at the Globe Arena.

Jordan signed for Kendal Town on one-month youth loan on 26 February 2018.

He was released by Morecambe at the end of the 2017–18 season.

After joining Chester from Ramsbottom United in the summer of 2018, Jordan joined Lancaster City in November 2018 on a dual-registration deal.

In 2019, Jordan Joined the Georgia State Panthers men's soccer program.

In 2020, he transferred to the Lander Bearcats to play for the Men's Soccer Program.

Career statistics

References

External links

Living people
English footballers
Chester F.C. players
English Football League players
Morecambe F.C. players
Association football forwards
1998 births
Lancaster City F.C. players
Ramsbottom United F.C. players
Kendal Town F.C. players